Queen Eleanor of Portugal may refer to:

Eleanor of Aragon, Queen of Portugal
Eleanor of Viseu

See also
Eleanor of Portugal (disambiguation)